Ma Liangxing (born 29 November 1957) is a Chinese football manager.

Career
Ma was the head coach of the China women's national team at the 2003 FIFA Women's World Cup.

References

External links
 
 
 Ma Liangxing at Soccerdonna.de 

1957 births
Living people
Chinese football managers
Women's association football managers
China women's national football team managers
2003 FIFA Women's World Cup managers